Elaine Lan Chao (born March 26, 1953) is an American businesswoman and former government official. A member of the Republican Party, she served as the 18th United States secretary of transportation in the Trump administration from 2017 to 2021, and as the 24th United States secretary of labor in the George W. Bush administration from 2001 to 2009. Chao was the first Asian American woman ever to serve in a presidential cabinet.

Born in Taipei, Taiwan, Chao immigrated to the United States when she was eight years old. Her father founded the Foremost Group, which eventually became a major shipping corporation. Chao was raised on Long Island, New York, and subsequently received degrees from Mount Holyoke College and Harvard Business School. She worked for a number of financial institutions before being appointed to several senior positions in the Department of Transportation under Presidents Ronald Reagan and George H. W. Bush, including Chair of the Federal Maritime Commission (1988–1989) and Deputy Secretary of Transportation (1989–1991). She served as Director of the Peace Corps from 1991 to 1992 and as president of the United Way of America from 1993 to 1996.

While not in government, Chao has served on several corporate boards of directors and worked for The Heritage Foundation and the Hudson Institute, two conservative think-tanks. Chao is married to U.S. Senator Mitch McConnell.

During her tenure as Transportation Secretary in the Trump administration, the Transportation Department's inspector general wrote a report with numerous instances where Chao used her office to promote her family's shipping business.

Early life and education

Elaine Chao was born in Taipei, Taiwan, on March 26, 1953, the eldest of six daughters of Ruth Mulan Chu Chao, a historian, and James S. C. Chao, who began his career as a merchant mariner and in 1964 founded the shipping company Foremost Maritime Corporation in New York City which developed into the Foremost Group. In 1961, at the age of 8, Chao came to the United States on a 37-day freight ship journey along with her mother and two younger sisters. Her father had arrived in New York three years earlier after receiving a scholarship.

Chao attended Tsai Hsing Elementary School in Taiwan for kindergarten and first grade. She attended Syosset High School in Syosset, New York, in Nassau County on Long Island and was naturalized as a U.S. citizen at the age of 19.

Chao received a Bachelor of Arts degree in Economics from Mount Holyoke College in South Hadley, Massachusetts, in 1975. In the second semester of her junior year, she studied money and banking at Dartmouth College. She received an MBA degree from Harvard Business School in 1979.

Career

Early career
Before entering public service, Chao was vice president for syndications at Bank of America Capital Markets Group in San Francisco, and she was an International Banker at Citicorp in New York for four years from 1979 to 1983. She was granted a White House Fellowship in 1983 during the Reagan Administration and was then Vice President, Syndications at Bank of America from 1984 to 1986.

In 1986, Chao became Deputy Administrator of the Maritime Administration in the U.S. Department of Transportation. From 1988 to 1989, she served as Chairwoman of the Federal Maritime Commission. In 1989, President George H. W. Bush nominated Chao to be Deputy Secretary of Transportation; she served from 1989 to 1991. From 1991 to 1992, she was the Director of the Peace Corps. She was the first Asian Pacific American to serve in any of these positions. She expanded the Peace Corps's presence in Eastern Europe and Central Asia by establishing the first Peace Corps programs in Poland, Latvia, Lithuania, Estonia, and the newly independent states of the former Soviet Union.

Between Bush administrations
Following her service in President George H.W. Bush's administration, Chao worked for three years from 1993 to 1996 as president and CEO of United Way of America. She is credited with returning credibility and public trust to the organization after a financial mismanagement scandal involving former president William Aramony. From 1996 until her appointment as Secretary of Labor, Chao was a Distinguished Fellow with The Heritage Foundation, a conservative think tank in Washington, D.C. She was also a board member of the Independent Women's Forum. She returned to the Heritage Foundation after leaving the government in January 2009.

U.S. Secretary of Labor (2001–2009)

Chao was the only cabinet member in the George W. Bush administration to serve for the entirety of his eight years. She was also the longest-serving Secretary of Labor since Frances Perkins, who served from 1933 to 1945 under President Franklin D. Roosevelt.

The Washington Post wrote towards the end of Chao's tenure as Labor Secretary that the Labor Department under her was "widely criticized for walking away from its regulatory function across a range of issues, including wage and hour law and workplace safety".

Union disclosure requirements
In 2002, a major West Coast ports dispute costing the U.S. economy nearly $1billion daily was resolved when the Bush administration obtained a national emergency injunction against both the employers and the union under the Taft–Hartley Act for the first time since 1971. Led by Chao, in 2003, for the first time in more than 40 years, the Department updated the labor union financial disclosure regulations under the Landrum–Griffin Act of 1959, which created more extensive disclosure requirements for union-sponsored pension plans and other trusts to prevent embezzlement or other financial mismanagement.

In 2004, the Department issued revisions of the white-collar overtime regulations under the Fair Labor Standards Act.

Government Accountability Office reports
After analyzing 70,000 closed case files from 2005 to 2007, the Government Accountability Office reported that the Department's Wage and Hour Division (WHD) inadequately investigated complaints from low- and minimum-wage workers alleging that employers failed to pay the federal minimum wage, required overtime, and failed to issue a last paycheck.

A 2008 Government Accountability Office report noted that the Labor Department gave Congress inaccurate numbers which understated the expense of contracting out its employees' work to private firms during Chao's tenure.

Mining regulation
A 2007 report by the department's Office of Inspector General (OIG) found that mine safety regulators did not conduct federally required inspections at more than one in seven of the country's 731 underground coal mines in 2006, and that the number of worker deaths in mining accidents more than doubled to 47 in that year. The Mine Safety and Health Administration (MSHA) "missed 147 inspections at 107 mines employing a total of 7,500 workers". A separate audit of 21 inspection reports determined that documents were missing, misdated, or mislabeled and that "MSHA officials misstated inspection statistics in reports and on the agency's Web site."

Mining disasters in 2006 and 2007 included West Virginia's Sago Mine explosion, which killed 12 in January 2006; West Virginia's Alma Mine fire, which killed two in January 2006; the Darby Mine No.1 explosion in Kentucky, where five miners died in May 2006; and the Crandall Canyon Mine collapse in Utah, which killed six workers and three rescuers in August 2007.

In 2010, the widows of the two men killed in the Alma Mine fire sued the federal government for wrongful death, citing lack of inspections, failure to act against violations, and conflicts of interest. "MSHA's review of the fire acknowledged significant lapses by inspectors, supervisors and district managers" at the mine but the agency did not admit liability for the negligent inspections. In 2013, the appeals court ruled that MSHA can be held liable "when a negligent inspection results in the wrongful death of a coal miner". The suit was settled in 2014, with MSHA agreeing to pay the two widows $500,000 each and to allow them to see OIG interviews pertaining to the fire; MSHA also agreed to develop a training course on preventing fires in underground mines.

Workplace safety
The Labor Department was widely criticized for "walking away from its regulatory function across a range of issues, including wage and hour law and workplace safety". A 2009 internal audit appraising an Occupational Safety and Health Administration (OSHA) initiative focusing on problematic workplaces for the past six years stated that employees had failed to gather needed data, conducted uneven inspections and enforcement, and failed to discern repeat fatalities because records misspelled the companies' names or failed to notice when two subsidiaries with the same owner were involved; it also noted that after rules changes in January 2008 the number of targeted companies declined by almost half.

Post-Bush administration (2009–2017)
In 2009, Chao resumed her previous role as a Distinguished Fellow at The Heritage Foundation, and she contributed to Fox News and other media outlets.

She also served as a director on a number of corporate and non-profit boards, including the Institute of Politics at the Harvard Kennedy School of Government, Wells Fargo, New York–Presbyterian Hospital, News Corp, Dole Food Company, and Protective Life Corporation. According to financial disclosure forms, Chao was slated to receive $1–5million as compensation for her service on the board of Wells Fargo. In June 2011, she was awarded the Woodrow Wilson Award for Public Service.

In January 2015, she resigned from the board of Bloomberg Philanthropies, which she had joined in 2012, because of its plans to significantly increase support for the Sierra Club's "Beyond Coal" initiative.

In February 2017, it was reported by the Associated Press that Chao had addressed organizations linked to the People's Mujahedin of Iran (aka Mojahedin-e Khalq or MEK), a group exiled from Iran after actions in the 1970s against the Shah of Iran and the Ayatollah Khomeini, as had former Joint Chiefs of Staff General Hugh Shelton, Commandant of the U.S. Marine Corps General James T. Conway, former National Security Advisor General James L. Jones, former CIA Directors Porter Goss and James Woolsey, former FBI Director Louis Freeh, former NYC Mayor Rudy Giuliani, and former Governors Howard Dean of Vermont and Ed Rendell of Pennsylvania. Chao was paid a total of $67,000 for the two speeches, which took place in 2015 and 2016.

Chao served as a distinguished fellow at the Hudson Institute until she was sworn in as U.S. Secretary of Transportation on January 31, 2017.

U.S. Secretary of Transportation (2017–2021)

U.S. President-elect Donald Trump announced on November 29, 2016, that he would nominate Chao to be Secretary of Transportation. The U.S. Senate confirmed Chao on January 31, 2017, by a vote of 93–6, with her husband, then-Senate majority leader Mitch McConnell, abstaining. While there was support on both sides of the Senate, some Senators feared contention, cautioning "against the privatization of government services, alluding to a possible point of friction between Democrats and the incoming Trump administration."

On January 7, 2021, the day after the January 6 United States Capitol attack, Chao submitted her resignation effective January 11, 2021. "In her two-page resignation letter to Trump, which included just one sentence about the Capitol riots, she thanked the president for the opportunity to serve as Transportation secretary and highlighted the department's accomplishments over the last four years."

Drone technology
In 2017, Chao announced the establishment of a pilot program to test and evaluate the integration of civil and public drone operations into the airspace system. In 2018 ten applicants were selected to participate in the project. In 2019, the Federal Aviation Administration (FAA) issued an air carrier and operator certificate to UPS Flight Forward for drone deliveries to a hospital campus in Raleigh, North Carolina. In December 2019, after multiple reports in Colorado and Nebraska of unidentified objects flying in formation at night over several remote rural counties, the FAA proposed a new rule that would require drones to be remotely identifiable.

Other proposals
In March 2019, Chao announced the formation of the Non-Traditional and Emerging Transportation Technology (NETT) Council, an internal Department of Transportation group for identifying "jurisdictional and regulatory gaps" when considering new transportation technologies. In April 2019, the FAA released proposed new regulations to modernize the rules for commercial space flight launches and reentries. At a congressional hearing in July 2019, the president of the Commercial Spaceflight Federation criticized the proposal as not delivering on its stated goals.

Controversies
An October 2018 Politico analysis found that Chao had more than 290 hours of appointments which were labelled as "private" during working hours on working days in the first 14 months of her tenure as Secretary of Transportation. Former Department of Transportation officials described this as unusual. Current DoT officials stated that the "private" labeling existed to help ensure Chao's security by obscuring her actual activities.

Conflicts of interest
As Secretary of Transportation, Chao appeared in at least a dozen interviews with her father, James, a shipping magnate with extensive business interests in China. The Transportation Department's inspector general cited numerous instances where Chao's office helped promote her family's shipping business. The inspector general asked the Trump administration's Justice Department in December 2020 to consider a criminal investigation into Chao, but the DOJ refused. Ethics experts said the appearances raised ethical concerns, as public officials are prohibited from using their office to profit others or themselves. Federal disclosures cited by The New York Times revealed a gift to Chao and her husband Mitch McConnell from Chao's businessman father James, valued between $5million and $25million. The company her father founded (and which her sister, Angela, currently runs), The Foremost Group, has extensive ties to the Chinese state and Chinese elites. It obtained hundreds of millions of dollars worth of loans from a bank owned by the Chinese state, has substantial interests tied to a major shipyard funded by and long-term contracts with a steel producer owned by the Chinese state. In what The Times described as "a rarity for foreigners", Angela and James Chao have served on the boards of a Chinese state-owned shipbuilder, and Angela has been on the board of the Bank of China, as well as the China Council for the Promotion of International Trade (which was created by the government of China).

From January 2018 to April 2019, 72% of the total tonnage shipped by Foremost was shipped to and from China. The Foremost Group has almost no footprint in the United States other than its headquarters in New York. During the period when Chao appeared with her father at promotional events for the family company, the US Department of Transportation repeatedly sought to cut funding and loan guarantees for domestic American shipping companies, shipyards, and shipbuilders. These proposed budget cuts were rejected by Congress in a bipartisan fashion. Chao's Department also sought for three years to prevent funding for a program that supports the viability of small domestic US shipyards, and a separate program that issues loan guarantees for the construction or reconstruction of ships with American registration.

Chao pledged in 2017 to sell the stock she had earned while she was on the board of directors of Vulcan Materials, one of the largest suppliers of road-paving materials in the United States, by April 2018. After the Wall Street Journal and other major news outlets reported in late May 2019 that she was still holding the stock, worth $250,000 to $500,000, she sold it on June 3, 2019, for a gain of $50,000 since April 2018.

In June 2019, Politico reported that in 2017 Chao had designated her aide Todd Inman as a special liaison "to help with grant applications and other priorities" for Transportation Department projects in the state of Kentucky, the only state to have such a liaison. Inman was to act as an intermediary between the Department, local Kentucky officials, and Kentucky Senator Mitch McConnell, who is Chao's husband. This resulted in grants of at least $78million for projects in Mitch McConnell strongholds Boone County and Owensboro. Inman had worked on the 2008 and 2014 re-election campaigns of McConnell; McConnell and local officials brought up the grants when he announced in Owensboro in December 2018 that he was running for re-election in 2020. Inman later became Chao's chief of staff.

In September 2019, the Democratic-controlled House of Representatives Committee on Oversight and Reform began an investigation into whether she used political office to benefit her family's business interests. A September 16 letter from the Oversight committee to Chao documented allegations that the Department of Transportation was forced to cancel a trip to China in 2017 that Chao had planned to take because State Department ethics officials challenged her attempts to include her family members in official meetings with the Chinese government.

Inspector General report
On March 4, 2021, the Inspector General released their report citing Chao for numerous ethics violations, including using department resources for personal errands and for promoting her father's biography. It also stated that it had referred its investigation to the Justice Department and the U.S. Attorney's Office in Washington D.C. for criminal prosecution in December 2020. Both declined to open criminal investigations into Chao.

Removal of Inspector General
In May 2020, the Trump administration removed the acting Inspector General of the Transportation Department, Mitch Behm. Behm, who was not a political appointee, was conducting an investigation into whether Secretary Elaine Chao was giving preferential treatment to projects in Kentucky. Her husband, Mitch McConnell, is the Senator of Kentucky and faced a re-election bid at the time.

Trump appointed Howard "Skip" Elliott as interim Inspector General of the Transportation Department. However, at the same time, Elliott served in a dual role where Chao was his boss. Thus, Elliott was head of an office that was investigating his own actions and those of Chao.

Post-Trump administration

In August 2021, Chao was elected to the board of directors of the Kroger supermarket chain. The news was met with backlash from Kroger customers on Twitter, with calls for a boycott trending nationally, due to her ties to the Trump administration and to her husband, Mitch McConnell.

In early October 2022, Donald Trump posted on his social media in a criticism of Mitch McConnell, "He has a DEATH WISH. Must immediately seek help and advise from his China loving wife, Coco Chow!" Trump used the racist nickname again in a November 13, 2022 post criticizing McConnell, saying "everyone despises [McConnell] and his otherwise lovely wife, Coco Chow!"

Awards and honorary degrees
Chao holds thirty-six honorary doctorates, including an honorary Doctor of Humane Letters from Georgetown McDonough School of Business in 2015. She was initiated into Omicron Delta Kappa at SUNY Plattsburgh as an honoris causa initiate in 1996.

Personal life
 In 1993, Chao married Mitch McConnell, U.S. Senator from Kentucky.

The University of Louisville's Ekstrom Library opened the "McConnell-Chao Archives" in November 2009. It is a major component of the university's McConnell Center.

Husband's campaigning
In the two years leading up to the 2014 U.S. Senate elections, Chao "headlined fifty of her own events and attended hundreds more with and on behalf of" her husband and was seen as "a driving force of his reelection campaign" and eventual victory over Democratic candidate Alison Lundergan Grimes, who had portrayed McConnell as "anti-woman". After winning the election, McConnell said, "The biggest asset I have by far is the only Kentucky woman who served in a president's cabinet, my wife, Elaine Chao."

She has been described by Jan Karzen, a longtime friend of McConnell's, as adding "a softer touch" to McConnell's style by speaking of him "in a feminine, wifely way". She has also been described as "the campaign hugger" and is also known for bipartisan socializing. For example, in 2014 she hosted a dinner with philanthropist Catherine B. Reynolds to welcome Penny Pritzker as Secretary of Commerce, where she spent the evening socializing with Valerie Jarrett, Obama's closest advisor.

The New York Times described Chao as "an unapologetically ambitious operator with an expansive network, a short fuse, and a seemingly inexhaustible drive to get to the top and stay there".

Chao's father has donated millions of dollars to Mitch McConnell's re-election campaigns. Chao's extended family has given more than a million dollars to McConnell's campaigns. The extended family is also a top contributor to the Republican Party of Kentucky, giving it approximately $525,000 over two decades.

The Chao family

Elaine Chao is the oldest of six sisters, the others being Jeannette, May, Christine, Grace, and Angela.

Grace is married to Gordon Hartogensis who was nominated by President Trump in May 2018 and confirmed by the U.S. Senate as director of the Pension Benefit Guaranty Corporation (PBGC), a part of the Labor Department, in May 2019. Hartogensis co-founded forecasting-software company Petrolsoft in 1989, which was purchased for $60million by Aspen Technology in 2000. He founded and led application software company Auric Technology LLC until it was sold to a company based in Mexico in 2011 and then helped govern the Hartogensis Family Trust.

In April 2008, Chao's father gave Chao and McConnell between $5million and $25million, which "boosted McConnell's personal worth from a minimum of $3million in 2007 to more than $7million" and "helped the McConnells after their stock portfolio dipped in the wake of the financial crisis that year".

In 2012, the Chao family donated $40million to Harvard Business School for scholarships to students of Chinese heritage and for the Ruth Mulan Chu Chao Center, an executive education building named for Chao's late mother. It is the first Harvard Business School building named after a woman and the first building named after an American of Asian ancestry. Ruth Mulan Chu Chao returned to school at age 51 to earn a master's degree in Asian literature and history from St. John's University in the Queens borough of New York City.

See also
 Taiwanese Americans in New York City
 Chinese Americans in New York City
 Group of Two
 List of female United States Cabinet members
 List of foreign-born United States Cabinet members
 List of people who have held multiple United States Cabinet-level positions

Notes

References

External links

|-

|-

|-

|-

1953 births
21st-century American politicians
21st-century American women politicians
American women chief executives
American politicians of Taiwanese descent
American women of Taiwanese descent in politics
Federal Maritime Commission members
George H. W. Bush administration personnel
George W. Bush administration cabinet members
Harvard Business School alumni
Hudson Institute
Kentucky Republicans
Living people
Mount Holyoke College alumni
American people of Chinese descent
New York (state) Republicans
News Corporation people
Peace Corps directors
People from Syosset, New York
Naturalized citizens of the United States
Politicians from Taipei
Reagan administration personnel
Spouses of Kentucky politicians
Syosset High School alumni
Taiwanese emigrants to the United States
The Heritage Foundation
Trump administration cabinet members
United States Deputy Secretaries of Transportation
United States Secretaries of Labor
United States Secretaries of Transportation
White House Fellows
Mitch McConnell
Chinese-American members of the Cabinet of the United States
Women members of the Cabinet of the United States
American politicians of Chinese descent
Articles containing video clips
Asian conservatism in the United States